Michael Simões Domingues  (born 8 March 1991), known as Mika, is a Portuguese professional footballer who plays as a goalkeeper.

Club career
Born in Yverdon-les-Bains, Switzerland to Portuguese parents, Mika joined U.D. Leiria's youth ranks in 2006, aged 15. He was promoted to the main squad for the 2009–10 season, as third choice. On 26 February 2010, in a home match against Vitória de Guimarães, he made his Primeira Liga debut, coming on as a substitute for Carlão after Hélder Godinho received a red card for committing a foul inside the box – he was not able to prevent Andrezinho from scoring the game's only goal in the subsequent penalty kick. The following campaign he was still a backup, but two of his three appearances were against Sporting CP and S.L. Benfica.

On 7 July 2011, whilst on international duty with the Portuguese under-20s, Mika signed a five-year contract with Benfica for €500,000. He played no official matches during 2011–12, playing understudy to experienced Artur and Eduardo, and went on to spend the following two seasons with the B team in the Segunda Liga.

On 27 January 2014, Mika cut ties with the Lisbon club. He signed for two years with second division side Atlético Clube de Portugal the same day, being first choice during his short tenure but not being able to help prevent relegation.

Mika returned to the top flight in summer 2014, penning a three-year deal with Boavista FC. During the 2016 off-season, he gained interest from Premier League clubs Leicester City and Sunderland: initial reports stated he agreed a move to the latter on transfer deadline day, but the deal was not finalised as the transfer window had already closed. The reason for the delayed transfer was a technical fault at the Portuguese end, but after an appeal to FIFA he was granted permission to join and signed a two-year contract.

Mika played no competitive games in his first season, serving as backup to Jordan Pickford and Vito Mannone. On 12 January 2018, player and the club mutually agreed to terminate his contract.

Mika returned to União de Leiria on 8 March 2018, with the team now competing in the third tier. He moved back to his country's top flight in the ensuing June, signing a one-year deal with Belenenses SAD.

International career
Mika was Portugal's starter at the 2011 FIFA U-20 World Cup in Colombia. He helped the national team reach the final without conceding a single goal, before losing to Brazil 2–3 in the decisive match. In the quarter-finals against Argentina he saved three penalties in the shootout and, in the following game, against France, he broke the record for number of minutes without conceding a goal in U-20 World Cup history in a 2–0 win; eventually, he was voted as best goalkeeper in the tournament.

Subsequently, Mika was chosen by under-21 manager Rui Jorge for the 2013 UEFA European Championship qualifying campaign. He played in half of the games, with Portugal just missing out on the play-off round.

Club statistics

Honours
Portugal U20
FIFA U-20 World Cup runner-up: 2011

Individual
FIFA U-20 World Cup Golden Glove: 2011

Orders
 Knight of the Order of Prince Henry

References

External links

1991 births
Living people
People from Yverdon-les-Bains
Swiss people of Portuguese descent
Citizens of Portugal through descent
Portuguese footballers
Association football goalkeepers
Primeira Liga players
Liga Portugal 2 players
Campeonato de Portugal (league) players
U.D. Leiria players
S.L. Benfica footballers
S.L. Benfica B players
Atlético Clube de Portugal players
Boavista F.C. players
Belenenses SAD players
Associação Académica de Coimbra – O.A.F. players
Sunderland A.F.C. players
Portugal youth international footballers
Portugal under-21 international footballers
Portuguese expatriate footballers
Expatriate footballers in England
Portuguese expatriate sportspeople in England